Ceruloplasmin (or caeruloplasmin) is a ferroxidase enzyme that in humans is encoded by the CP gene.

Ceruloplasmin is the major copper-carrying protein in the blood, and in addition plays a role in iron metabolism. It was first described in 1948. Another protein, hephaestin, is noted for its homology to ceruloplasmin, and also participates in iron and probably copper metabolism.

Function 

Ceruloplasmin (CP) is an enzyme synthesized in the liver containing 6 atoms of copper in its structure. Ceruloplasmin carries more than 95% of the total copper in healthy human plasma. The rest is accounted for by macroglobulins. Ceruloplasmin exhibits a copper-dependent oxidase activity, which is associated with possible oxidation of Fe2+ (ferrous iron) into Fe3+ (ferric iron), therefore assisting in its transport in the plasma in association with transferrin, which can carry iron only in the ferric state.  The molecular weight of human ceruloplasmin is reported to be 151kDa.

Despite extensive research, much is still unknown about the exact functions of CP, most of the functions are attributed to CP focus on the presence of the Cu centers. These include copper transport to deliver the Cu to extrahepatic tissues, amine oxidase activity that controls the level of biogenic amines in intestinal fluids and plasma, removal of oxygen and other free radicals from plasma, and the export of iron from cells for transport through transferrin.

Mutations have been known to disrupt the binding of copper to CP and will disrupt iron metabolism and cause an iron overload.

Ceruloplasmin is a relatively large enzyme (~10nm); the larger size prevents the bound copper from being lost in a person's urine during transport.

Active site structure 
The multicopper active site of CP contains a type I (T1) mononuclear copper site and a trinuclear copper center ~ 12-13 Å away (see figure 2).  The tricopper center consists of two type III (T3) coppers and one type II (T2) copper ion.  The two T3 copper ions are bridged by a hydroxide ligand while another hydroxide ligand links the T2 copper ion to the protein.  The T1 center is bridged to the tricopper center by two histidine (His1020, His1022) residues and one Cys(1021) residue.  The substrate binds near the T1 center and is oxidized by the T1 Cu2+ ion forming the reduced Cu+ oxidation state.  The reduced T1 Cu+ then transfers the electron through the one Cys and two His bridging residues to the tricopper center.  After four electrons have been transferred from the substrates to the copper centers, an O2 binds at the tricopper center and undergoes a four-electron reduction to form two molecules of water.

Regulation

A cis-regulatory element called the GAIT element is involved in the selective translational silencing of the Ceruloplasmin transcript.
The silencing requires binding of a cytosolic inhibitor complex called IFN-gamma-activated inhibitor of translation (GAIT) to the GAIT element.

Clinical significance 

Like any other plasma protein, levels drop in patients with hepatic disease due to reduced synthesizing capabilities.

Mechanisms of low ceruloplasmin levels:
 Gene expression genetically low (aceruloplasminemia)
 Copper levels are low in general
 Malnutrition/trace metal deficiency in the food source
 Zinc toxicity, due to induced copper deficiency
 Copper does not cross the intestinal barrier due to ATP7A deficiency (Menkes disease and Occipital horn syndrome)
 Delivery of copper into the lumen of the ER-Golgi network is absent in hepatocytes due to absent ATP7B (Wilson's disease)

Copper availability doesn't affect the translation of the nascent protein. However, the apoenzyme without copper is unstable. Apoceruloplasmin is largely degraded intracellularly in the hepatocyte and the small amount that is released has a short circulation half life of 5 hours as compared to the 5.5 days for the holo-ceruloplasmin.

Ceruloplasmin can be measured by means of a blood test; this can be done using immunoassays . The sample is spun and separated; it is stored around 4°C Celsius for three days. This test is to determine if there are signs of Wilson disease. Another test that can be done is a urine copper level test; this has been found to be less accurate than the blood test. A liver tissue test can be done as well.

Mutations in the ceruloplasmin gene (CP), which are very rare, can lead to the genetic disease aceruloplasminemia, characterized by hyperferritinemia with iron overload. In the brain, this iron overload may lead to characteristic neurologic signs and symptoms, such as cerebellar ataxia, progressive dementia, and extrapyramidal signs. Excess iron may also deposit in the liver, pancreas, and retina, leading to cirrhosis, endocrine abnormalities, and loss of vision, respectively.

Deficiency 

Lower-than-normal ceruloplasmin levels may indicate the following:
 Wilson disease (a rare [UK incidence 2/100,000] copper storage disease).
 Menkes disease (Menkes kinky hair syndrome) (rare – UK incidence 1/100,000)
 Copper deficiency
 Aceruloplasminemia
 Zinc toxicity

Excess 

Greater-than-normal ceruloplasmin levels may indicate or be noticed in:
 copper toxicity / zinc deficiency
 pregnancy
 oral contraceptive pill use
 lymphoma
 acute and chronic inflammation (it is an acute-phase reactant)
 rheumatoid arthritis
 Angina
 Alzheimer's disease
 Schizophrenia
 Obsessive-compulsive disorder

Reference ranges 

Normal blood concentration of ceruloplasmin in humans is 20–50 mg/dL.

References

Further reading

External links 
  GeneReviews/NCBI/NIH/UW entry on Aceruloplasminemia
  OMIM entries on Aceruloplasminemia
 

Acute-phase proteins
Chemical pathology
EC 1.16.3
Hepatology
Iron metabolism
Copper enzymes